Chawpi Punta (Quechua chawpi center, middle, punta peak; ridge, "central peak (or ridge)", also spelled Chaupipunta) is a mountain in the Andes of Peru which reaches an altitude of approximately . It is located in the Ancash Region, Bolognesi Province, Huasta District. Chawpi Punta lies at the Pampa Wayi valley, southwest of Puka Qaqa (Quechua for "red rock").

References 

Mountains of Peru
Mountains of Ancash Region